Per Ottesen (born 19 October 1932) is a Norwegian sports official.

Hailing from Trondheim, Ottesen chaired Byåsen IL and Sør-Trøndelag District Skiing Association. In 1982 he became vice president of the Norwegian Ski Federation, being elected president in 1985. He is largely credited for landing the 1997 FIS Nordic World Ski Championships to his hometown. Ottesen also led the World Championships organizational committee; however, after falling out with managing director Carl Petter Brun, he resigned only 93 days before the opening ceremony.

He is decorated with the King's Medal of Merit in gold.

References

1932 births
Living people
People from Trondheim
Norwegian sports executives and administrators
Recipients of the King's Medal of Merit in gold